Theo Timmermans may refer to:
 Theo Timmermans (footballer, born 1989)
 Theo Timmermans (footballer, born 1926)